Fyllia ( or) is a village in Cyprus, 9 km east of Morphou. De facto, it is under the control of Northern Cyprus.

In 2011, the Serhartköy Photovoltaic Power Plant (with 2 GWh annual electricity capacity) was constructed by the help of the Council of the European Union to Turkish Cypriots.

References

External links
 

Communities in Nicosia District
Populated places in Güzelyurt District